Serra is a municipality in the comarca of Camp de Túria in the Valencian Community, Spain.

References

Municipalities in Camp de Túria
Populated places in Camp de Túria